The Bleriot XLIV was a single-seat observation monoplane designed in France by Louis Bleriot during the early 1910s.

Specifications

References

Single-engined tractor aircraft
Aircraft first flown in 1913
Rotary-engined aircraft
Blériot aircraft